Camilla Joy Cynthia Power (born 13 November 1976) is an Irish-born English actress. She is best known for her appearances in the television series Emmerdale and Waterloo Road.

Early life and education
Power was born in Cork, Ireland, and is a distant cousin of the actor Tyrone Power. Her great-grandfather was Sir John Power, Member of Parliament for Wimbledon before the Second World War. She attended the Sylvia Young Theatre School in Marylebone, and started acting from an early age; her first TV appearance was on a chicken nuggets commercial, and an early screen role was as Sabina Halliday in A Summer Story (1988).

Career
Power appeared in Channel 4’s The Manageress in 1990 and played Jill Pole in BBC Television’s  The Silver Chair (1990), an adaptation of the book by C. S. Lewis. She also had parts in Bonjour la Classe (1993) and Moonacre (BBC, 1993), the last calling for skill at horse-riding. From  1993 to 1995 she was a regular cast member on the Yorkshire Television soap Emmerdale, playing Jessica McAllister.

Power made her stage debut in a theatrical adaptation of The Prime of Miss Jean Brodie at the National Theatre in 1998. She had roles in the television drama series Murder in Mind and The Brief.

In 2006, she appeared in the BBC One school-based drama series Waterloo Road as English teacher Lorna Dickey and returned for the second series in 2007, until her character committed suicide after being diagnosed with multiple sclerosis. In early 2008 she starred in the Torchwood episode "From Out of the Rain" as Pearl, a circus star who escapes from an old cinema film and seeks revenge on those who put her out of business. Power was seen in the British action movie The Tournament as the ruthless assistant to Liam Cunningham's Tournament Master. In 2012, she appeared in two episodes of ITV drama Whitechapel.

In 2016, she appeared in "Shut Up and Dance", an episode of the anthology series Black Mirror.

Filmography

References

External links
 

1976 births
Living people
English television actresses
English people of Irish descent
20th-century English actresses
21st-century English actresses
Alumni of the Sylvia Young Theatre School
Actresses from Cork (city)